Kunjunni (10 May 1927 - 26 March 2006), popularly known as Kunjunni Mash (Mash is the Malayalam equivalent of teacher), was an Indian poet of Malayalam literature. Known for his short poems with a philosophical overtone, his works were popular among children as well as grown-ups. He received several honors including three awards from the Kerala Sahitya Akademi viz. Kerala Sahitya Akademi Award for Children's Literature, Kerala Sahitya Akademi Award for Poetry and Kerala Sahitya Akademi Award for Overall Contributions.

Early life and career
Kunjunni was born on 10 May 1927 at Valapad, a village in Thrissur district in the south Indian state of Kerala to Njayapilly Illathu Neelakantan Moosath and Athiyarathu Narayani Amma. Kunjunni started his career as a teacher at the Chelari school. He joined Ramakrishna Mission Sevashrama High School in Kozhikode in 1953. He was an inmate of the Ashrama and taught, looked after, and interacted with the hostel boys there. He retired from teaching in 1982 but continued to live in the Ashrama, which he had found to be most suitable for his unpretentious life and writings are known for their simplicity, till he retired to his district for health reasons. Kunjunni died in his ancestral house at Valapad on 26 March 2006.

He was known and admired for living a humble life with minimal needs, and few comforts or luxuries.

Works 

He was known for writing short poems which appeared to be childlike in form but conveyed a message. Kunjunni handled the column for children in the Mathrubhumi weekly under the pseudonym "Kuttettan". He initiated three or four generations of aspiring writers into writing. Kunjunni returned to his native village in 1987 and became involved in social and cultural activities in the Thrissur area. He appeared in Bhoomi Geetham, a 1993 film directed by Kamal. His autobiography, Enniloode, is noted for its candour, humour and simplicity. Oridathu Oridathu Oru Kunjunni Mash is a biography of the poet, written by Sippy Pallippuram.

Bibliography 

 
 
 
 
 
 
 
 
 
 
 
 
 
 
 
 
 
 
 
 
 
 
 
 
 
 
 
 
 
 
 
 
 
 
Vithum Muthum
Kutti Pencil
Kuttikal Padunnu
Undanum Undiyum
Kalikoppu
Pathinanchum Pathinanchum
Aksharathettu
Nonsense Kavithakal
Muthumani
Chakkarappava
Kadalippazham
Kalikkalam

Awards 
Kerala Sahitya Akademi selected Kunjunni for their annual award for children's literature in 1977 for his work, Aksharathettu. He received the State Institute of Children's Literature Award in 1982, followed by the Kerala Sahitya Akademi Award for Poetry in 1987. The academy honoured him again in 2001 with the Award for Overall Contributions in 2001. He received the lifetime achievement award of the State Institute of Children's Literature in 2002, the same year as he received the Vazhakunnuam Award. A year later, he was awarded the V. A. Kesavan Nair Award (2003). He was also a recipient of the Tomyas Award.

Feature and short films
2014: 'Mayilpeeli thundum vala pottukalum': a docufiction, directed by Biju Meya. The character of Kunjunni Mash was portrayed by Krishnan Namboothiri.

References

Further reading

External links 
 
 
 
 

1927 births
2006 deaths
People from Thrissur district
Poets from Kerala
Malayalam-language writers
Malayalam poets
Ramakrishna Mission schools alumni
Recipients of the Kerala Sahitya Akademi Award
20th-century Indian poets
Indian male poets
20th-century Indian male writers